Kvarsnes can refer to:

 Kvarsnes Foreland, a prominent foreland projecting into Edward VIII Bay, Antarctica
 Kvarsnes Bay, a small bay at the southwest side of Kvarsnes Foreland
 , a village in Gildeskål, Nordland, Norway